"Gypsys, Tramps & Thieves" is a song by American singer and actress Cher from her 1971 seventh studio album Chér (eventually reissued under the title Gypsys, Tramps & Thieves). Kapp Records, a division of MCA Records, released it as the album's lead single on September 1, 1971. The song was written by Bob Stone, and produced by Snuff Garrett. Since Sonny Bono's first attempts at reviving Cher's recording career had been unsuccessful, the record company recruited Garrett as her producer and he chose Stone to write a song specifically for Cher, in order to cater to an adult audience.

"Gypsys, Tramps & Thieves" is an upbeat pop and folk rock story-song that features instrumentation from a carnival calliope and a piano with strings in the background. Cher sings from the point of view of a 16-year-old Romani girl, who was "born in the wagon of a traveling show" and describes her life. It contains themes of racism, teenage pregnancy and prostitution. The song received positive reviews by music critics, and earned Cher a Grammy Award nomination in the Best Female Pop Vocal Performance category. 

Commercially, it became Cher's first solo number-one single on the record charts in Canada and United States, the first single by a solo artist to rank number one on the Billboard Hot 100 at the same time as on the Canadian Singles Chart. It also reached the top five in Australia, Ireland, Malaysia, New Zealand, Singapore and the United Kingdom. It was certified gold by the Recording Industry Association of America for shipment of one million copies across the United States. At the time of its release, "Gypsys, Tramps & Thieves" was the biggest-selling single in the history of MCA.

"Gypsys, Tramps & Thieves" has been performed on several episodes of The Sonny & Cher Comedy Hour (1971-74) and Cher (1975-76) and also on six of Cher's world tours. The song has been recorded by a number of artists, including Vikki Carr, Vicki Lawrence and Nirvana and has appeared in or been referenced in some TV shows such as The Simpsons, The X-Files and Charmed. Along with the parent album, "Gypsys, Tramps & Thieves" has been considered a turning point in Cher's career, with critics starting to acknowledge her as an artist and credited the song for restoring her popularity, which had diminished at the end of the previous decade.

Song information
"Gypsys, Tramps & Thieves" was the first single from Chér with instrumental backing by L.A session musicians from the Wrecking Crew. The album was subsequently renamed and re-released as Gypsys, Tramps & Thieves after the success of the single. The song was written by songwriter Bob Stone as a story-song called "Gypsys, Tramps and White Trash". Producer Snuff Garrett advised that the title be changed and Stone then changed it to "Gypsys, Tramps & Thieves". The album of the same name got very positive reviews.

Released four years after her last top ten hit "You Better Sit Down Kids", this song was a comeback single for Cher—it was her first single in four years to chart higher than #84—not only returning her to the top 10 of the charts but also giving her two weeks at #1 on the Billboard Hot 100 in November 1971. It knocked off "Maggie May" by Rod Stewart which had spent the previous month at #1. The single also reached #1 in Canada and #4 in the United Kingdom. It was the first single by a solo artist to rank number one on the U.S. Billboard Hot 100 chart at the same time as on the Canadian Singles Chart. As of November 2011, Billboard reported the digital sales of "Gypsys, Tramps & Thieves" to be 212,000 in the US.

The song describes the life of a girl, the song's narrator, who was "born in the wagon of a traveling show" with her mother, an exotic dancer, and father, a patent medicine salesman and preacher. Though the family endures jeers of being "gypsies, tramps and thieves" from townspeople, the men of the town would always come out at night to "lay their money down." One day, the family takes in a 21-year-old man who travels with them from "just south of Mobile" to Memphis. One night during the trip, the man implicitly has intercourse with the 16-year-old narrator without her father knowing, and three months after the man disappears in Memphis, the narrator is "in trouble" (pregnant). The narrator's daughter is born later, with the family continuing to dance, sell nostrums and preach to support themselves.

The title of this song has also been shown with the alternative spelling "Gypsies", this being a correct spelling of this word. The song was described by Rob Tennanbaum in Billboard magazine as one of the greatest songs of the 20th century.

Live performances
Cher performed the song on the following concert tours:
 Do You Believe? tour (performed as part of the Hits Medley)
 Living Proof: The Farewell Tour (performed as part of the Hits Medley)
 Cher at the Colosseum
 [[Dressed to Kill Tour (Cher)|Dressed to Kill Tour]] Classic Cher
 Here We Go Again Tour (only during the Oceanian leg of the tour)

Music video

The video for "Gypsys, Tramps & Thieves" was Cher's first music video. The video was a recorded performance of the song on The Sonny & Cher Comedy Hour in 1971. Throughout the video Cher is singing in front of a house wagon and in front of a fire. A second video was made, but it was very similar to the original. In the second video, clips of dancing female gypsies were shown.

Remix version
In 2002, a special remix medley was created by Dan-O-Rama for a video montage that was used in Cher's Living Proof: The Farewell Tour''. The medley contains the videos of "All I Really Want to Do", "Gypsys, Tramps & Thieves", "Half-Breed", and "Dark Lady".

Charts and certifications

Weekly charts

Year-end charts

Certifications

References

External links
Lyrics to Vicki Lawrence's 1973 version of this song
Official website of Cher
 

1971 songs
1971 singles
Cher songs
MCA Records singles
Billboard Hot 100 number-one singles
Cashbox number-one singles
Song recordings produced by Snuff Garrett
Songs against racism and xenophobia
RPM Top Singles number-one singles
Songs about teenagers
Songs about prostitutes